Bouchelle is a surname. Notable people with the surname include:

 John W. Bouchelle (1807–1898), American politician and farmer
 John W. Bouchelle (died 1937), American politician and farmer
 Lisa Bouchelle, American singer and songwriter